Hey, Kiddo: How I Lost My Mother, Found My Father, and Dealt with Family Addiction is a graphic memoir by Jarrett J. Krosoczka, published October 9, 2018 by Graphix. The book tells the story of Krosoczka's childhood living with his grandparents while his mother lived with a substance use disorder.

Reception

Reviews 
Hey, Kiddo is a Junior Library Guild book. It received many positive reviews, including starred reviews from Booklist, The Bulletin of the Center for Children's Books, The Horn Book, Kirkus Reviews, Publishers Weekly, School Library Journal, and Shelf Awareness.

Kirkus called the book "[h]onest, important, and timely."

Writing for Booklist, Sarah Hunter noted, "There have been a slew of graphic memoirs published for youth in the past couple of years, but the raw, confessional quality and unguarded honesty of Krosoczka’s contribution sets it apart from the crowd."

Kelley Gile of School Library Journal said it was "[a] compelling, sometimes raw look at how addiction can affect families. A must-have, this book will empower readers, especially those who feel alone in difficult situations."

The audiobook, narrated by Krosoczka and a cast of others, is a Junior Library Guild book. It also received a starred review from Booklist, who said, "It’s some sort of spectacular... In a production that is meticulously produced and spellbinding to experience, Krosoczka’s challenging childhood becomes a cathartic, captivating friends-and-family aural affair to remember."

Hey, Kiddo was named one of the best nonfiction books of 2018 by The Horn Book.

Awards

References 

2018 graphic novels
2018 non-fiction books